The gene EEA1 encodes for the 1400 amino acid protein, Early Endosome Antigen 1.

EEA1 localizes exclusively to early endosomes and has an important role in endosomal trafficking. EEA1 binds directly to the phospholipid phosphatidylinositol 3-phosphate through its C-terminal FYVE domain and forms a homodimer through a coiled coil. EEA1 acts as a tethering molecule that couples vesicle docking with SNAREs such as N-ethylmaleimide sensitive fusion protein, bringing the endosomes physically closer and ultimately resulting in the fusion and delivery of endosomal cargo.

Function 
EEA1 is a RAB5A effector protein which binds via an N-terminal zinc finger domain and is required for fusion of early and late endosomes and for sorting at the early endosome level.

Involvement in pathogenesis
Due to the proteins importance in vesicular trafficking, a number of intracellular bacteria prevent EEA1 recruitment to the vacuole. Mycobacterium tuberculosis is known to inhibit the recruitment of EEA1 to the phagosomal membrane through CamKII. Legionella pneumophila also prevents EEA1 recruitment through a currently unknown mechanism. The related pathogen Legionella longbeachae recruits EEA1 and appears to replicate within a modified early endosome.

See also 
 endosome
 Phosphatidylinositol 3-phosphate
 FYVE domain

References

External links 
 
 

Peripheral membrane proteins